Luis Alberto Maldonado Morocho (born 15 May 1996) is an Ecuadorian footballer who plays as a midfielder for Italian  club Turris.

Career
In 2015, he was sent on loan to Este in the Italian fourth division Serie D from Italian Serie A club Chievo.

While playing for Arzignano in the Italian fourth division, he received offers from the second and third division but could not join due to not having citizenship of the European Union at the time.

In 2020, Maldonado signed for Italian third division Serie C team Catania. After the league initially did not register him due to question about his legal status, he was accepted to play on 8 October 2020.

On 20 January 2022, he moved to Catanzaro in Serie C.

On 12 August 2022, Maldonado signed with Lecco. On 10 January 2023, he moved to Turris.

References

External links
 

1996 births
Living people
People from El Oro Province
Ecuadorian footballers
Association football midfielders
Serie C players
Serie D players
A.C. ChievoVerona players
A.C. Este players
F.C. Arzignano Valchiampo players
Catania S.S.D. players
U.S. Catanzaro 1929 players
Calcio Lecco 1912 players
S.S. Turris Calcio players
Ecuadorian expatriate footballers
Expatriate footballers in Italy
Ecuadorian expatriate sportspeople in Italy